Janet "Jenny" McCallum or Janet Richardson (21 July 1881 – 24 March 1946) was a Scottish trade unionist and working-class suffragette in a movement which was predominantly made up of middle and upper-class activists.

Life
McCallum was born in Dunfermline in 1881. She was the eldest of the thirteen children of John and Jenny McCallum. Her father worked on the construction of the Forth Bridge. She worked in a linen weaving factory and she was unusual in becoming a working-class woman who was active in the women's suffrage movement.

In 1907 she organised what was called a "Great Demonstration" where the national leaders of the Women's Social and Political Union would come to West Fife.

By 1908, she had joined Anna Munro in the Women's Freedom League. The league was a break away group from the WSPU who objected to the autocratic management of the Pankhursts.  By 27 October 1908 she was in London. She had abandoned her job in a Dunfermline linen factory. She and 14 others were arrested after staging a demonstration in Old Palace Yard outside the houses of parliament; "a newspaper report says "four very athletic suffragettes clambered on a statue".". She was given the choice of paying a £5 fine or serving a sentence and chose a one month sentence. After leaving Holloway Prison she went to Glasgow on behalf of the WFL.

She returned to Dunfermline and after some time she resumed working so that she could help support her mother and sister. She married Harry Richardson in 1915 and they had three children. In 1919 she came to the fore in a dispute with the Scottish National Housing Company. She gathered attention for the Rosyth tenants who were involved in what was presented as a women-led rent strike. The dispute led to some tenants appearing in court and McCallum was able to arrange for Sylvia Pankhurst to speak on their behalf.

In the 1920s Harry and Janet decided to emigrate as there was little work in Scotland. By the time votes for women were agreed, she was living in South Africa. McCallum died in Pretoria in South Africa 1946.

References 

1881 births
1946 deaths
People from Dunfermline
Scottish suffragists